is a Japanese actor.

Career
Born in Aomori Prefecture, Fukikoshi moved to Tokyo at age 19 and joined the Wahaha Honpo theater troupe.  Since leaving Wahaha in 1999, he has appeared in many films and television dramas, while continuing to act on stage. He works in both serious drama and comedy, and has often played police detectives.

He starred in Sion Sono's Cold Fish. He co-starred with Hideaki Itō in Takashi Miike's Lesson of the Evil.

Personal life
In 1994, Fukikoshi married the actress Reona Hirota. They divorced in 2005 after having one child, but then remarried in 2012. The couple separated for the second time in December 2016.

Filmography

Film
 Gamera 2: Attack of Legion (1996)
 Love & Pop (1998)
 Samurai Fiction (1998)
 Whiteout (2000)
 Red Shadow (2001)
 The Twilight Samurai (2002)
 Spy Sorge (2003)
 Lady Joker (2004)
 Year One in the North (2005)
 Limit of Love: Umizaru (2006)
 Kabei: Our Mother (2008)
 The Chasing World (2008)
 Yoroi Samurai Zombie (2008)
 Sweet Rain (2008)
 Love Exposure (2008)
 Shinjuku Incident (2009)
 Asahiyama Zoo Story: Penguins in the Sky (2009)
 Ballad (2009)
 My Rainy Days (2009)
 Listen to My Heart (2009)
 Last Operations Under the Orion (2009)
 Cold Fish (2010)
 Heaven's Story (2010)
 Himizu (2011)
 Antoki no Inochi (2011)
 Unfair 2: The Answer (2011)
 Afro Tanaka (2012)
 Space Brothers (2012)
 Land of Hope (2012)
 Lesson of the Evil (2012)
 The Mole Song: Undercover Agent Reiji (2014)
 Age Harassment (2015)
 The Mole Song: Hong Kong Capriccio (2016)
 Mori, The Artist's Habitat (2018)
 Lady in White (2018)
 According to Our Butler (2019)
 A Girl Missing (2019)
 The Gun 2020 (2020)
 Angry Rice Wives (2021)
 Between Us (2021)
 The Mole Song: Final (2021)
 Red Post on Escher Street (2021)
 Tenjō no Hana (2022), Sakutarō Hagiwara
 Motherhood (2022)
 We Make Antiques! Osaka Dreams (2023)
 Ginpei-cho Cinema Blues (2023)
 Winny (2023), Masashi Akita
 Revolver Lily (2023)

Television
 Dondo Hare (2007)
 Deka Wanko (2011)
 Inu o Kau to Iu Koto (2011)
 Amachan (2013)
 Gunshi Kanbei (2014) – Ashikaga Yoshiaki
 Moribito: Guardian of the Spirit (2016) – Gakai
 Specialist (2016) – Hiroki Takidō
 Naotora: The Lady Warlord (2017) – Ono Masanao
 Hello, Detective Hedgehog (2017)
 Kishū Hanshu Tokugawa Yoshimune (2019) – Yanagisawa Yoshiyasu
 Kishiryu Sentai Ryusoulger (2019) - Naohisa Tatsui
 Idaten (2019)

Video games 
 Yakuza 5 (2012) - Naoki Katsuya

References

External links
 

Japanese male actors
1965 births
Living people
Actors from Aomori Prefecture